Sticta guilartensis is a species of foliose lichen in the family Peltigeraceae. Found in Puerto Rico, it was formally described as a new species in 2020 by Joel Mercado‐Díaz and Robert Lücking. It is only known to occur at this single locality, where it grows on rocks and on roots and trunks of trees, often with bryophytes, in shaded and humid habitats. The specific epithet refers to the name of the forest at the type locality, Bosque Estatal de Guilarte.

References

guilartensis
Lichen species
Lichens described in 2020
Lichens of the Caribbean
Taxa named by Robert Lücking